Erich Kaspar is a male former international table tennis player from Austria.

Table tennis career
He won a silver medal at the 1938 World Table Tennis Championships in the Swaythling Cup for Austria with Richard Bergmann, Helmut Goebel, Alfred Liebster and Karl Schediwy.

See also
 List of table tennis players
 List of World Table Tennis Championships medalists

References

Austrian male table tennis players
World Table Tennis Championships medalists